The October 2010 North American storm complex is the name given to a historic extratropical cyclone that impacted North America. The massive storm complex caused a wide range of weather events including a major serial derecho stretching from the Gulf Coast to the Great Lakes, a widespread tornado outbreak across the Southeast United States and Midwest and a blizzard across portions of the Canadian Prairies and the Dakotas. The cyclone's lowest minimum pressure of  made it the second most intense non-tropical system recorded in the continental United States (CONUS). The lowest confirmed pressure for a non-tropical system in the continental United States was set by a January 1913 Atlantic coast storm.

Meteorological synopsis
Significant snowfall was reported on the backside of the storm. The heaviest snow fell in parts of Minnesota where 9 inches (22.5 cm) of snow was reported in St. Louis County, Minnesota. Heavy snow and blizzard conditions also occurred in North Dakota, southwestern Manitoba and southeastern Saskatchewan.

The non-tropical cyclonic storm generated wind speeds of up to 70 mph, caused by a severe low pressure zone over Nebraska on October 24th.

Akron, Cleveland, Findlay, Marion, Lorain, Mansfield, Toledo, Wooster and Youngstown, Ohio all witnessed heavy winds on the 24th.

Severe weather battered Illinois, Indiana, Michigan, and Ohio on the 25th and 26th of October, producing strong winds, rain, hail, and widespread tornadoes. It was the region's second strongest storm on record. The weather station in Bigfork, Minnesota recorded a state record atmospheric pressure of 955.2 millibars (28.21 inches of pressure), typical of a Category 3 hurricane. The National Weather Service reported that a tornado with a maximum speed of 115 mph touched down about four miles east of Peotone in Will County, south of Chicago, that morning and traveled 2.9 miles, causing downed power lines and partially destroying a home. Another tornado was reported to have landed in Racine, Wisconsin.

Heavy damage was reported in the Chicago area, particularly in Kane, Will, Kankakee, and Iroquois Counties in Illinois and in Porter County in Indiana. The winds flipped single engine planes on their sides at DuPage Airport in West Chicago, and flights were delayed by 30 minutes at O'Hare and Midway airports. More than 300 flights were canceled at O'Hare International Airport, and more than 60,000 ComEd customers were without power. Several other less powerful tornadoes also occurred in Alabama, Arkansas, Kentucky, Michigan, North Carolina, Ohio, South Carolina, Tennessee, Texas, Virginia and Wisconsin. Heavy snow also fell in south western Ontario. There were no fatalities with this system. A GOES satellite image on October 26 showed what could be considered the eye of the storm over the Minnesota-Ontario border, with outlying clouds reaching as far as Alberta, southern Nunavut, Newfoundland, eastern Montana, Colorado, Louisiana, Maine and Bermuda.

The storm developed so quickly, that it was declared to be a weather 'bomb', which is an extremely fast developing storm that drops at least one millibar of pressure per hour for 24 hours—a phenomenon more commonly seen over water than land.

On the morning of October 26, a serial derecho caused widespread damage in Kentucky, Tennessee, Illinois, Wisconsin, Michigan and Ohio Tuesday. Louisville, Ky; Cincinnati, Cridersville, and Toledo, Ohio, Nashville, Tennessee Indianapolis were hit at 9 am CDT, and Detroit was hit during the midday and early afternoon hours. Other cities impacted by the storms included Pittsburgh, Pa., Buffalo, N.Y., and Charleston, W.Va. At one point in the morning a line of tornado warnings stretched from central Michigan down to northern Mississippi. Tornado damage to homes was also reported in and around Peotone, Ill., and Kokomo, Ind., while another tornado reportedly uprooted and downed trees onto homes near Racine, Wis.

On October 28, the storm system left the East Coast. During the next few days, the system moved eastward across the Atlantic, before stalling over the western Mediterranean on November 1. On November 5, the system dissipated over the western Mediterranean region.

Confirmed tornadoes

October 23 event

October 24 event

October 25 event

October 26 event

October 27 event

See also

Tornadoes of 2010
Cyclone Carmen

References

North American Storm Complex
Blizzards in the United States
10-23
Storm Complex
Articles containing video clips
Extratropical cyclones
Storm Complex
Storm Complex
Natural disasters in Minnesota
Natural disasters in North Carolina
Natural disasters in North Dakota
Natural disasters in Manitoba
Natural disasters in Saskatchewan
2010 disasters in Canada